English Freakbeat, Volume 3 is a compilation album in the English Freakbeat series, featuring recordings that were released decades earlier, in the mid-1960s.

Release data
The album was released as an LP in 1989 by AIP Records (as #AIP-10048) and as a CD in 1997 (as #AIP-CD-1048).

Vinyl-only tracks and CD bonus tracks
The English Freakbeat LPs and CDs have most tracks in common, although not always in the same order, and some of the LP tracks were not included on the CDs.  Also, the CD bonus tracks are not always at the end of the album.  Thus, for clarity, we have shown tracks for both editions of the album, with vinyl-only tracks and CD bonus tracks indicated.

Notes on the tracks
The following information is taken mostly from the CD liner notes.  The In Crowd included some stellar players:  Twink, previously of the Fairies who was also the drummer for the Pretty Things for a time and later a founding member of the Pink Fairies; Steve Howe, later of Yes and a bandmate of Twink in the Fairies; and vocalist Keith West.  "Why Must They Criticize" is from their last single in late 1965; shortly thereafter, the band changed its name to Tomorrow and went on to release one of the classic psychedelic rock albums of the 1960s.

Dean Maverick real name "Pete Harper" was the singer in (beat band) The Attraction of ( Romford Harold Hill &  Dagenham ).  This song is from the flip side of their second single; the "A" side, a cover of the Kinks' "Party Line" was produced by Dave Davies (whose early band the Ravens is also featured on this disk).

The Thoughts started out as a back-up band for acts like Paul Dean, Tiffany and Johnny & John.  While the classic "A" side of their single, "All Night Long" has been compiled several times, this is the first re-appearance of the flip.

"Take Away" by the Couriers is taken from their only single; the "B" side is on English Freakbeat, Volume 1.  Several more recordings by the Sons of Fred are included on English Freakbeat, Volume 4. The Sons of Fred who recorded at E.M.I. Studios, later Abbey Road Studios included guitarist Mick Hutchinson, and Pete Sears on bass. Sears went on to record bass or piano with many artists including Long John Baldry, Stoneground, Silver Metre, Rod Stewart, John Cipollina, Jefferson Starship, Nick Gravenites, John Lee Hooker, Hot Tuna and Moonalice. Sons of Fred also performed on 1960 television shows like Thank Your Lucky Stars, and Ready Steady Goes Live.

The Mockingbirds are a predecessor band to 10cc and already included both Graham Gouldman and Kevin Godley.  This cut is from their last of five singles.

The bandmembers of the Raving Savages – who backed Screaming Lord Sutch – included  Deep Purple co-founder Ritchie Blackmore and sideman extraordinaire Nicky Hopkins.  This cover of the Jan & Dean classic "Surf City" comes from a 1963 surf EP that the band released under their own name in the same time period.

The numerous rarities that populate the bonus tracks on the second half of the CD more than make up for  the three LP cuts that are omitted.  Although they would eventually evolve into the Kinks, the bandleader for the Ravens was Dave Davies before the even greater genius in younger brother Ray was evident.  The second and third tracks sound like "the Kinks unplugged", while the first is an excellent cover of one of the coolest Leiber/Stoller songs, "I'm a Hog for You".

The Talismen released one 45 that includes "Casting My Spell", while "What Kind of Boy" comes from a very rare Italian album by the band; the producer is Shel Talmy.

"Keep Me Covered" is the flip side of the first single by the Frays; they followed that up with a cover of "My Girl Sloopy".  Bandmember Mike Patto was later in Timebox, Patto and several other bands.

Dave Dee, Dozy, Beaky, Mick & Tich is a fairly well known bubblegum group; this track was evidently released only in Germany in connection with the band's appearance at the legendary Star Club in Hamburg (where the Beatles gained early prominence).

Track listing

LP

Side 1:

 The Frame: "Doctor Doctor" — rel. 1967, vinyl-only track
 The In Crowd: "Why Must They Criticize" — rel. 1965
 The Sons of Fred: "I, I, I Want Your Lovin'" — rel. 1965
 The Sons of Fred: "She Only Wants a Friend" — rel. 1965
 Rupert's People: "Dream in My Mind" — rel. 1967, vinyl-only track
 Thee: "There You Go" — rel. 1965
 The UK's: "Your Love Is All I Want" (Tony Bailey) — rel. 1964
 Miller: "Baby I Got News for You" — rel. 1965

Side 2:

 The Attractions: "She's a Girl" — rel. 1966
 Bryan & the Brunelles: "Jacqueline"
 The Ways & Means: "Breaking up a Dream"
 The Thoughts: "Memory of Your Love"
 The Couriers: "Take Away"
 The Mockingbirds: "One by One" — rel. 1966
 The Answers: "It's Just a Fear" — rel. 1966
 The Barrier: "Spot the Lights" — rel. 1968, vinyl-only track

CD
 The Sons of Fred: "I, I, I Want Your Lovin'" — rel. 1965
 The Sons of Fred: "She Only Wants a Friend" — rel. 1965
 The In Crowd: "Why Must They Criticise" — rel. 1965
 Thee: "There You Go" — rel. 1965
 The UK's: "Your Love Is All I Want" — rel. 1964
 The Attraction: "She's a Girl" — rel. 1966
 Bryan & Brunelles: "Jacqueline"
 Ways & Means: "Breaking up a Dream"
 The Thoughts: "Memory of Your Love"
 The Couriers: "Take Away"
 The Mockingbirds: "One by One"
 The Answers: "It's Just a Fear" — rel. 1966
 The Raving Savages: "Surf City" — rel. 1963, CD bonus track
 Svensk: "Getting Old", CD bonus track
 The Ravens: "I'm a Hog for You Baby", CD bonus track
 The Ravens: "I Believed You", CD bonus track
 The Ravens: "This I Know", CD bonus track
 The Quakers: "She's All Right", CD bonus track
 The Quakers: "Talk to Me", CD bonus track
 The Talismen: "You Break My Heart", CD bonus track
 The Frays: "Keep Me Covered" — rel. 1965, CD bonus track
 The Favourite Sons: "Walking Walking Walking", CD bonus track
 The Shakespeares: "Burning My Fingers" — rel. 1968, CD bonus track
 Dave Dee, Dozy, Beaky, Mick & Tich: "He's a Raver", CD bonus track
 Talismen: "What Kind of Boy", CD bonus track

1989 compilation albums
Compilation albums by British artists
Pop rock compilation albums
Psychedelic rock compilation albums